Kayhan Kaynak (born 14 October 1960 - 9 January 1994) was a Turkish footballer best known for his stint in the Turkish Süper Lig with Adanaspor.

Kayhan was a prolific goalscorer in Adanaspor, and transferred to Fenerbahçe where he had some successful seasons.
After falling out with management, Kayhan joined Konyaspor, scoring 28 goals in 68 games, becoming the first superstar for the team.

Death
Kayhan died on 9 January 1994 of a heart attack, the same condition that killed his brothers Reşit and İrfan. He died during training for Adana Demirspor. After his death, a stadium was named after him in Adana.

Personal life
Kayhan was born in to a large family of 8 children. His brothers Orhan, Reşit, İrfan, İlhan and Ayhan were all professional footballers.

References

External links
 
 
 

1960 births
1994 deaths
People from Adana
Turkish footballers
Turkey international footballers
Turkey youth international footballers
Adanaspor footballers
Fenerbahçe S.K. footballers
Konyaspor footballers
Eskişehirspor footballers
Aydınspor footballers
Adana Demirspor footballers
Süper Lig players
TFF First League players
Association football forwards